The Alto Tarauacá Extractive Reserve is an extractive reserve in the state of Acre, Brazil.

Location

The Alto Tarauacá Extractive Reserve is divided between the municipalities of Tarauacá (37.63%), Marechal Thaumaturgo (4.64%) and Jordão (62.37%) in the state of Acre.
The Tarauacá River runs through the south of the reserve, then forms the eastern boundary of the north part of the reserve.
The southwest of the reserve adjoins the Alto Juruá Extractive Reserve.
The northwest of the reserve adjoins the Riozinho da Liberdade Extractive Reserve.
The reserve would be included in the proposed Western Amazon Ecological Corridor.

History

The reserve is classed as IUCN protected area category VI (protected area with sustainable use of natural resources).
An extractive reserve is an area used by traditional extractive populations whose livelihood is based on the extraction, subsistence agriculture and breeding small animals.
Its basic objectives are to protect the livelihoods and culture of these populations, and to ensure the sustainable use of natural resources.

The Instituto Nacional de Colonização e Reforma Agrária (National Institute for Colonization and Agrarian Reform – INCRA) recognised the reserve on 3 November 2003 as meeting the agro-extraction needs of 170 families.
This was corrected on 19 December 2006 to allow for 300 families.
A working group to administer the reserve was created on 4 December 2006.
The deliberative council was created on 14 December 2010.
The reserve is administered by the Chico Mendes Institute for Biodiversity Conservation.
It is supported by the Amazon Region Protected Areas Program.
The reserve helps reduce illegal and predatory extraction of hardwood, especially cedar and mahogany.

Economy

The nearest school is in the town of Jordão.
About 30% of the population are illiterate.
25% of the population are aged between 7 and 14, but only 10% attend school.
90% of families use river or stream water, and only 10% use a well or spring.
About 80% have no water filter in their home.
Only 7% have an outhouse or latrine.

The main extracted products are rubber and nuts.
Other forest products are extracted in smaller quantities.
The residents grow beans, rice and cassava, and market their surplus.
They raise ducks, chickens, pigs, sheep, goats, donkeys and horses.
Transport is difficult, particularly in the dry season from June to September.
Most tappers routinely hunt paca, pigs and pampas deer, and 90% of households consume fish from the streams and lakes.

See also 
 Matsés National Reserve

Notes

Sources

2000 establishments in Brazil
Extractive reserves of Brazil
Protected areas of Acre (state)